Yekdangi (also Romanized as Yekdangī and Yekdāngī) is a village in Gamasiyab Rural District, in the Central District of Sahneh County, Kermanshah Province, Iran. At the 2006 census, its population was 242, in 53 families.

References 

Populated places in Sahneh County